New Alliance may refer to: 
 New Alliance (Benin), a political party in Benin
 Liberal Alliance (Denmark), a political party in Denmark formerly known as New Alliance
 New Alliance Records, a record label in the U.S.

See also
 New Alliance for Democracy and Development in Burundi
 New Alliance Party (Mexico), a political party in Mexico
 New Alliance Party, a former political party in the United States
 New Alliance Party (Cook Islands)

de:Bund (Bibel)#Bund im Neuen Testament